Phoroctenia is a genus of true crane flies found in northern Europe, eastern Russia, and western North America. The only currently described species is P. vittata (Meigen, 1830)

References

Tipulidae
Diptera of Europe
Diptera of North America
Diptera of Asia
Taxa named by Daniel William Coquillett